Hodaghatta is a village situated in Mandya Taluk, Mandya district, Karnataka, India. It has pincode 571450.

References 

Villages in Mandya district